The 2012 AFC U-16 Championship was the 15th edition of the tournament organized by the Asian Football Confederation. The AFC approved Iran as hosts of the championship on 23 November 2011. The top 4 teams qualified for the 2013 FIFA U-17 World Cup, hosted by the United Arab Emirates. Qualification for the tournament started in 2011.

Host Selection
The Organising Committee for AFC Youth Competitions for the 2011–2015 term announced that Iran and Palestine were interested in hosting the 2012 AFC U-16 Championship Finals.

Per decision of the AFC Competitions Committee, the host nation should qualify for the final tournament. The decision on the hosts was taken in the committee’s meeting on 21 November 2011 based on the results of the qualifiers.

Qualification

The qualification draw was held on 30 March 2011.

Qualifiers

Venues

Draw
The draw for the competition was held on 10 May 2012 in Tehran, Iran.

Group stage
In the group stage the tie-breaking criteria is direct matches before goal difference.

Group A

Group B
Iraq and Australia played a penalty shootout after their final group match to determine their ranking. Iraq won that 3–2.

Group C

Group D

Knockout stage

Knockout Map

Quarterfinals

Semifinals

Final

Winners

Countries to participate in 2013 FIFA U-17 World Cup
The four semi-finalists qualified for 2013 FIFA U-17 World Cup.

Goalscorers

Tournament team rankings

References

External links 
  

 
Under
International association football competitions hosted by Iran
2012 in youth association football
AFC U-16 Championships
AFC U-16 Championships